Saxlund is a Norwegian surname.

Notable people
Notable people with this surname include:
 Alf Eivind Saxlund (1890–1973), Norwegian military officer and barrister
 Eivind Saxlund (1858–1936), Norwegian lawyer and writer
 Susana Saxlund (born 1957), Uruguayan former swimmer

References